The Episcopal Conference of Colombia is an administrative institution and permanence of the Catholic Church, composed of all the bishops of the dioceses of Colombia in a college, in communion with the Roman Pontiff and under his authority to exercise set of certain pastoral functions of the episcopate on the faithful of their territory under the rule of law and statutes, in order to promote the life of the Church, to strengthen its mission of evangelization and respond more effectively to the greater good that the Church should seek to men.

Ecclesiastical organization

The Catholic Church is present in 13 locations with groundwater, 52 suffragan dioceses, 10 apostolic vicariate 1 and Military Ordinary:

The Archdiocese of Barranquilla is suffragan dioceses of The Tour Santa Marta and Valledupar Riohacha

The Archdiocese of Bogotá has as suffragan dioceses of Engativá Facatativá Fontibón Soacha and Zipaquirá Girardot

The Archdiocese of Bucaramanga is suffragan diocese of Barrancabermeja Malaga Soatá Socorro and San Gil and Velez

The Archdiocese of Cali diocese is suffragan of Carthage and Palmyra Buga Buenaventura

The Archdiocese of Cartagena is Magangué suffragan dioceses of Monteria and Sincelejo Montelibano

The Archdiocese of Ibague is suffragan dioceses of Florence Garzón Lebanon Cord-Honda and Neiva

The Archdiocese of Manizales has the suffragan dioceses of La Dorada-Guaduas Armenia and Pereira

The Archdiocese of Medellín has the suffragan dioceses of Caldas Girardota Jericho and Sonson-Rionegro

The Archdiocese of New Pamplona diocese is suffragan of Ocana and Cucuta Tibú Arauca

The Archdiocese of Popayan is suffragan dioceses of Ipiales Mocoa Sibundoy meals and Tumaco

The Archdiocese of Santa Fe de Antioquia is suffragan diocese of Apartado Tado-Istmina Quibdó and Santa Rosa de Osos

The Archdiocese of Tunja is suffragan dioceses of Chiquinquirá Duitama-Sogamoso Garagoa and Yopal

The Archdiocese of Villavicencio is suffragan dioceses of Colombia Granada and San Jose del Guaviare

The Vicariate Apostolic of Guapi, Inirida, Leticia, Mitu Puerto Carreno Puerto Gaitan, San Andres and Providencia, San Vicente, Puerto Leguizamo, Tierradentro and Trinidad are immediately subject to the Holy See

The Military Ordinary in Colombia

Presidents

See also
Catholic Church in Colombia

External links 
 CEC.org 
 GigaCatholic
 UCatholica

Colombia
Catholic Church in Colombia

it:Chiesa cattolica in Colombia#Conferenza episcopale